Solo Concert is a live album by guitarist Ralph Towner recorded in 1979 and released on the ECM label.

Reception
The Allmusic review by Scott Yanow awarded the album 4 stars, stating, "The interpretations are typically sensitive, thoughtful, and often introspective, but also show off Towner's impressive technique".

Track listing
All compositions by Ralph Towner except as indicated
 "Spirit Lake" - 8:43   
 "Ralph's Piano Waltz" (John Abercrombie) - 7:04   
 "Train of Thought" - 5:30   
 "'Zoetrope" - 6:00   
 "Nardis" (Miles Davis) - 5:12   
 "Chelsea Courtyard" - 6:53   
 "Timeless" (Abercrombie) - 4:54
Recorded live at Amerika Haus in München, Germany and Limmathaus in Zürich, Switzerland in October 1979

Personnel
Ralph Towner — twelve-string guitar, classical guitar

References

ECM Records live albums
Ralph Towner albums
1980 live albums
Albums produced by Manfred Eicher